AIDS Research and Human Retroviruses  is a peer-reviewed scientific journal focusing on HIV/AIDS research, as well as on human retroviruses and their related diseases. The journal was founded in 1983 as AIDS Research, and acquired its current name in 1987. It is published by Mary Ann Liebert, and edited by R. Keith Reeves and Lish Ndhlovu.

It is the official journal of the International Retrovirology Association.

Indexing and abstracting
AIDS Research and Human Retroviruses is indexed and abstracted in the following databases:

External links
AIDS Research and Human Retroviruses website
International Retrovirology Association website

Publications established in 1983
Immunology journals
Mary Ann Liebert academic journals
English-language journals
HIV/AIDS journals
Academic journals associated with learned and professional societies